The 2019 Florida Tech Panthers football team represented the Florida Institute of Technology (FIT) during the 2019 NCAA Division II football season. They were led by seventh-year head coach Steve Englehart. The Panthers played their home games at Florida Tech Panther Stadium, approximately one mile from the Florida Tech campus, and were members of the Gulf South Conference. In May 2020, Florida Tech shut down its football program due to budget cuts that followed the COVID-19 pandemic.

Preseason

Gulf South Conference coaches poll
On August 1, 2019, the Gulf South Conference released their preseason coaches poll with the Panthers predicted to finish in 5th place in the conference.

Preseason All-Gulf South Conference Team
The Panthers had four players at four positions selected to the preseason all-Gulf South Conference team.

Offense

No players were selected

Defense

John McClure – DB

Special teams

No players were selected

Schedule
Florida Tech 2019 football schedule consists of five home and six away games in the regular season. The Panthers will host GSC foes Shorter, West Alabama, West Florida, and West Georgia, and will travel to Delta State, Mississippi College, North Greenville, and Valdosta State.

The Panthers will host one of the three non-conference games against Fort Valley State from the Southern Intercollegiate Athletic Conference (SIAC) and will travel to Newberry from the South Atlantic Conference (SAC) and Savannah State also from the SIAC.

Two of the eleven games will be broadcast on ESPN3 and ESPN+, as part of the Gulf South Conference Game of the Week.

The Week One game at Savannah State, originally scheduled for September 7, was moved back a day due to Hurricane Dorian.

The Week Seven game at Valdosta State, originally scheduled for a 3 P.M. kickoff on October 19, was moved back to a 7 P.M. start due to the forecast approach of Tropical Storm Nestor earlier in the day.

Schedule Source:

Rankings

Game summaries

at Savannah State

at Newberry

at Delta State

West Georgia

Fort Valley State

at Mississippi College

at Valdosta State

West Florida

West Alabama

at North Greenville

Shorter

Awards and milestones

Gulf South Conference honors

Five players from Florida Tech were honored as All-GSC selections by the league's coaches.

Gulf South Conference All-Conference First Team

Evan Thompson, LB

Gulf South Conference All-Conference Second Team

Miles Kelly, WR
Kenny Hiteman, TE
Tyrone Cromwell, DB
John McClure, DB

Gulf South Conference Offensive Player of the Week
September 30: Mike Diliello, QB

Gulf South Conference Freshman of the Week
September 23: Mike Diliello, QB 
September 30: Mike Diliello, QB

References

Florida Tech
Florida Tech Panthers football seasons
Florida Tech Panthers football